Native Commerce is a digital marketing & e-commerce company founded by the same digital marketing pioneers behind DigitalMarketer.com. They build communities, the brands, and the commerce.

History
The company was founded by Perry Belcher, Ryan Deiss, Roland Frasier in 2012 with Keren Kang as the CEO. Sites include Survival Life, DIY Projects, Makeup Tutorials, Gun Carrier, Sewing, Nail Designs, Cute Outfits, Garden Season, Homesteading.

Associations of Native Commerce includes National Craft Association, the Family Protection Association, American Beauty Association, and The American Gun Association.

Ecommerce brands include Mason & Ivy, Hong Kong Tailor, The Survival Life Store, Hoffman Richter, Hybeam. The company ranked #412 on the Inc 5000 in 2016.

In 2017, the company changed to Native Commerce Media, which is now Plattr, and digital marketing agency specializing in healthcare marketing, SEO, content marketing, and social media marketing.

Native Commerce Affiliated Brands 

 Survival Life (now owned by Olympus Peak Media)
 Gun Carrier (now owned by Olympus Peak Media)
 Makeup Tutorials (now owned by Rival Brands)
 DIY Projects (now owned by Rival Brands)
 Homesteading (now owned by Rival Brands)

References

Online retailers of the United States